Tropheus brichardi is a species of cichlid endemic to Lake Tanganyika where it is found in areas with substrates of solid rock in the central portion of the lake. It can be found in the aquarium trade. The specific name honours Pierre Brichard (1921–1990) the aquarium fish exporter who provided the authors with the type.

References

External links
 Photograph

brichardi
Taxa named by Thys van den Audenaerde
Taxa named by Mark H. J. Nelissen
Fish described in 1975
Taxonomy articles created by Polbot